The following are the national records in athletics in Zimbabwe maintained by the National Athletic Association of Zimbabwe (NAAZ).

Outdoor

Key to tables:

+ = en route to a longer distance

y = denotes one mile

OT = oversized track (> 200m in circumference)

Men

Women

Indoor

Men

Women

Notes

References
General
World Athletics Statistic Handbook 2019: National Outdoor Records
World Athletics Statistic Handbook 2018: National Indoor Records
Specific

Zimbabwean
records
Athletics
Athletics